Llangammarch was a rural ecclesiastical parish in Powys, mid-Wales, through which flow the rivers Irfon and Cammarch. The main centre of population is the spa village of Llangammarch Wells. It is in the historic county of Brecknockshire (Breconshire).

John Penry, Wales's most famous Protestant martyr, was born at Cefn Brith, a farm near Llangammarch,  which is traditionally recognised as his birthplace.

Llangammarch Community embraces Cefn Gorwydd and Tirabad. Llangammarch has an active history society and many activities in the Alexandra Hall.

Church parishes in Wales
Powys

cy:Llangammarch